Miracleman (originally Marvelman) is a fictional British Golden Age comic book superhero, originally created by Mick Anglo for publisher L. Miller & Son in 1955, and debuting in Marvelman #102, dated July 10 of that year. The character was subsequently revived in 1982 by Alan Moore and Garry Leach as the lead of Marvelman in the pages of Warrior. After that publication was cancelled the revival was continued as Miracleman by Eclipse Comics in 1985, with the character renamed accordingly, but went out of print following the company's demise in 1994.

After a 15-year hiatus brought on by a confused legal situation, the character was successfully brought back into print by Marvel Comics in 2010, initially reverting to the Marvelman name. From 2014 onwards Marvel began reprinting the revival material, once again using the Miracleman name, and in 2022 began continuing the story.

Creation
Following Fawcett Publications' cessation of their superhero titles in 1953, British publisher L. Miller & Son were left with the prospect of having to cancel their popular Captain Marvel and Captain Marvel Jr. weeklies due to a lack of material. Len Miller contacted Mick Anglo, whose Gower Street Studio had provided cover artwork and other material for Miller's titles, to create a replacement. Anglo modified Captain Marvel, changing his human identity from newsboy Billy Batson to copyboy Micky Moran. The character's superhuman form was changed from Captain Marvel to Marvelman, after consideration was given to naming the new character Captain Miracle and Miracleman - both names that would later be used by Anglo for further derivatives of Captain Marvel. Anglo took the opportunity to simplify the character's costume, eliminating Captain Marvel's cloak and switching his lightning bolt to a simpler "MM" chest logo. To provide greater contrast Marvelman was given close-cropped blond hair and a predominantly blue colour scheme. Anglo considered giving the character a gravity belt but eventually decided to retain flight as an inherent ability of the superhero.

While Marvelman and (less frequently, despite debuting concurrently) Young Marvelman are occasionally called the first British superheroes this is not the case as the short-lived DC Thomson Dandy character The Amazing Mr. X debuted some ten years previously.

Publication history

1954-1963

Due to the backlog of Fawcett material Miller already had the company was able to prepare readers for the upcoming change. Captain Marvel #19, dated 19 December 1953, featured an in-character letter from 'Batson' to readers, telling them he planned to lead an ordinary life and would be handing over his duties to Marvelman; #24 featured the modified title Captain Marvel - the Marvelman and from #25 the title was renamed Marvelman, with the new character taking over. A similar process would take place on sister title Captain Marvel Jr., which would become Young Marvelman. The result was well-received by readers, and sales of Marvelman were actually larger than those of its' predecessor. Anglo initially wrote and drew the strips himself; later other Gower Studio artists would work on the character, including James Bleach, Norman Light and Don Lawrence. Marvelman would also occasionally appear in the pages of Young Marvelman and later starred the additional monthly title Marvelman Family, which also featured Kid Marvelman. However by 1961 sales were declining as imported American comics began to arrive on the British market, featuring full-colour strips rather than the black-and-white adventures of Marvelman. Miller switched Marvelman to a monthly reprint title, causing Anglo to unsuccessfully attempt to set up his own Anglo Features label after turning down an offer to work for Miller's son Arnold on his own venture. Marvelman finally ended in 1963, and the character went into obscurity.

1982-1985

In 1981 Dez Skinn opted to revive the character for anthology Warrior. After his preferred choices turned him down, he became aware of Alan Moore's similar interest in reviving the character and requested a proposal. Impressed by the writer's ideas, Skinn commissioned Moore as writer for the strip, which debuted in the first issue of Warrior in March 1982. Moore would later relate that he was drawn to the character's resemblance of the concept of the Übermensch from the writings of Friedrich Nietzsche, a concept that the work would frequently draw on in the work. Once again after others had demurred, Garry Leach was assigned to draw the strip. He modelled the revised Marvelman on actor Paul Newman and redesigned the chest insignia into a more modern style. He and Moore opted for a graceful look for the character in contrast to the more common musclebound superhero archetype. 

The strip was a critical success, winning Favourite Comic Character (UK) at the 1984 Eagle Awards, and continued to be a success when Alan Davis took over as artist. Vintage Gower Street material would also be reprinted in the one-off Marvelman Special, with the conceit it presented imaginary adventures of the character. However, creative differences between Moore and Davis would lead to the strip stalling in 1985; while Grant Morrison was eager to take over Marvelman the dispute would prevent the strip from returning before Warrior was cancelled in 1985 after its' losses became unsustainable for Skinn.

1985-1993
The story was eventually picked up by American publisher Eclipse Comics in 1985. To avoid legal attention from Marvel Comics the series and its' leads were renamed Miracleman; Moore had previously suggested this as an alternate title in his original proposal as a substitute name should the editor decide against reviving Marvelman, and had also used it in print for the name of a proxy version of the character that had featured briefly in his parallel work on Marvel UK's Captain Britain strip. Those involved do not appear to have been aware of the name being previously considered by Anglo, or its' use as the name given to a series of British reprints of the artist's Spanish-market Superhombre. Moore was initially resistant to the name change due to Marvelman having predated the establishment of Marvel Comics but eventually agreed, though he would air his dissatisfaction with the issue in an essay printed in the second issue of the title. Eclipse began by printing coloured, relettered versions of the Warrior material before Miracleman #7 (cover dated April 1986) saw the story continue with new material. The series continued its' critical success, and was by Eclipse's standards a sizeable commercial success. Initially Chuck Austen (then using his birthname Chuck Beckum) drew the new adventures before Rick Veitch continued the work. From Miracleman #11, John Totleben became regular artist until #16, which was also the final issue of Moore's run.

Moore then passed over the title to Neil Gaiman, having completed the stories he had planned for the character. Gaiman and new artist Mark Buckingham planned three six-issue storylines for the character, and opted for an anthology approach for the initial arc. As such "The Golden Age" focused more on Miracleman's impact on Earth than the character himself, who was more felt than seen across Miracleman #17-22, largely featuring in cameos by various literary devices such as flashbacks, imaginary sequences and fictions-within-fictions. Meanwhile Gaiman found that numerous other creators were interested in working on the character; to harness this and expand their revenue, Eclipse produced the three-issue limited series Miracleman: Apocrypha, featuring contributions by the likes of Alex Ross, Kurt Busiek, Matt Wagner, James Robinson and Darick Robertson. Gaiman and Buckingham provided a framing story for the series which established it as a collection of imaginary stories. Miracleman returned to being more central in the creative team's second arc, "The Silver Age". However, after only two issues of the storyline had been published Eclipse went bankrupt; this also prevented the publication of another spin-off mini-series called Miracleman Triumphant, written by Fred Burke and drawn by Mike Deodato and taking place between Gaiman's first two arcs.

1995-2008

Gaiman mistakenly believed at the time he owned a one-third share of the rights to the Miracleman characters, with the other two-thirds residing with Eclipse. As such he reached an arrangement with Roger Broughton to continue the series once the Canadian publisher purchased Eclipse's rights. However at the 1996 liquidation auction Broughton was outbid by Todd McFarlane, who had collaborated with Gaiman on various Spawn spinoffs. Gaiman began legal action while McFarlane remained sure he owned the character, and produced Miracleman merchandise. A reimagined Mike Moran, now a principled journalist at the New York Daily Times, was added to the supporting cast of Hellspawn, a dark spin-off title of Spawn, in February 2001. Artist Ashley Wood released teaser images of Miracleman ahead of his planned debut in Hellspawn #12. However, Wood left the book after Hellspawn #11 and the storyline was abandoned when Gaiman sued McFarlane in 2002. In-universe, the appearances were subsequently ascribed to the character Man of Miracles, whose aspect is shaped by the perceptions of others.

2009-Present
Since 2001, Marvel editor-in-chief Joe Quesada had been among the major industry figures to support Gaiman in the dispute. Marvel eventually discovered in 2009 that the rights to the Marvelman characters had resided with Anglo all along, having never been officially purchased by Skinn (who believed the character was in the public domain, and reached a private agreement with Anglo) in 1981. They licensed the characters from Anglo directly and in 2010 began a series of reprints of classic material under the Marvelman name. In 2014 after further legal rights were secured they began to reprint the revival material, now named Miracleman once again. New material appeared in 2015, and from 2022 Gaiman and Buckingham continued The Silver Age storyline after a hiatus of nearly 20 years. Marvel also published the one-shot Timeless in 2021, foreshadowing Miracleman's introduction to the Marvel Universe.

Fictional character biography

Original
Having discovered the keyword to the universe through his experiments, Mississippi-based astro-scientist Guntag Barghelt travels the world searching for a worthy recipient of this power. After young Micky Moran first attempts to return a dime Barghelt dropped and then defends the scientist from a trio of hoodlums, the scientist takes the youth to his laboratory. There further tests reveal Micky has absolute integrity and a well-defined discernment of good and evil, and treats him in his atomic machine. Micky is granted the power to turn into the superpowered Marvelman whenever he speaks the keyword "Kimota". After Marvelman thwarts an attempt by the villainous Herman Schwein to capture Barghelt's notes, the scientist withdraws to an asteroid in outer space, knowing Marvelman will protect good on Earth. Micky works for the Daily Bugle newspaper as a copyboy and keeps his superhero identity secret from the world while using his power to protect the innocent. To help him fight evil, Marvelman would later call on the scientist again when impressed by the courage of messenger boy Dicky Dauntless, and calls up Barghelt once again. The scientist gives Dicky an elixir that allows him to transform into Young Marvelman, who would become Marvelman's ally in the fight against evil. Marvelman later selected another youth, Johnny Bates, who was granted the ability to become Kid Marvelman.

Among his many victories, Marvelman prevented Boromanian spy Balco from using the experimental XB999 atomic bomber aircraft against Washington, prevented crooks from poisoning Oklabama's water supply with radium, and foiled an attempt by Professor Zargunza to use memory-loss gas on the world. Marvelman also crossed paths with mad scientist Dr. Gargzuna, thwarting his plan to use animated skeletons to intimidate a judge. Gargunza would however return with numerous other amoral plans, which Marvelman again defeated. 

Other escapades Marvelman was involved in included preventing Boromanian attempts to sabotage Professor Jowik's new megabathysphere; stopping the ice cream-crazed Abominable Snowman and his Snowman minions; defeating super-computer the Electronic Brain,; foiling a Boromanian plot to use scientist Doctor Ramado's miniaturised hydrogen bomb to blow up a table tennis tournament; saving oblivious astronaut Professor Swivelhead from his own oblivious behaviour; clearing his name after circus strongman the Great Anvello framed him as a criminal; defeating scientist Cuprini's evil mirror image version of himself; preventing destruction of a United States Navy squadron by a two-headed kraken; dealing with an epidemic of insomnia brought on by the King of the Land of Nod sulking; using a demonstration of his formidable powers to cause Martian War Lords to abort a planned invasion of Earth; stopping jealous electrical genius Austin Amps and his attempts to sabotage rival Oswald Ohms' all-electric town Wattingham; 
travelling back to 1588 and helping Royal Navy Captain Farnaby warn England about the Spanish Armada; ending the crime spree of Professor Coisson's Marvelman II, a robot double of the hero; foiling the attempt of unlicensed dentist Mr. Nook to use misery gas in revenge for being exposed as a quack by Moran; putting an end to Nazi Otto Gruber's attempt to create a Fourth Reich; beating wizard Wizzo the Wizard and his mirror-henchman namlevraM; capturing embezzler Charles Crank despite his attempts to hide out on the Moon}; thwarting the attempts of Menzari driver Heinz Vifter to beat rival Nevady driver Micky Desmond to the Golden Wheel via sabotage;
exposing pickpocketing clowns from a travelling circus; forestalling an invasion from underground hat-wearing giant ants; undoing disgruntled prop manager Eddie Gay's attempts to sabotage a documentary made by Peakpoint Films;
uncovering cargo cult-leading machine Klashna;
and halting elderly bad-luck projecting nuisance Irwin M. Trouble

He would also team up with Young Marvelman and Kid Marvelman as the Marvelman Family to face threats such as Garrer and his army of time-travelling renegades; a combined alliance of Marvelman's arch-enemy Doctor Gargunza and his nephew, Young Marvelman rogue Young Gargunza; the King of Vegetableland; invaders from the planet Vardica; would-be dictator Professor Batts and his speech-scramber; a crime boss intent on sinking Pacific City below the ocean; the cruel, slave-driving King Snop of Atlantis (which the story revealed would eventually become Australia); an attempt by Gargunza to declare himself King of the Universe; cruel 14th century knight Simon de Carton (clearing the name of Amadis of Gaul in the process); a monster accidentally collected from the planet Droon; and Professor Wosmine's shrinking ray

Revival
Michael "Mike" Moran was born in 1942. His father was in the RAF but was killed during World War II, and his mother died of illness while Mike was still young, leaving him an orphan. As such his name came to the attention of the RAF intelligence unit Spookshow. He was abducted as the first subject of Project Zarathustra in 1954 and brainwashed into thinking he was a copyboy at the Daily Bugle newspaper. At age 14 Moran believed that an astro-scientist called Guntag Borghelm, who had discovered the Harmonic Key to the Universe, granted him the ability to change into the superhero Miracleman when he said the word "Kimota". In actuality, Miracleman was a superpowered clone of Moran created by Doctor Emil Gargunza using recovered Qys body-swapping technology, and the Miracleman identity was part of a complex para-reality program to allow the government to retain control of the superhuman. As such Miracleman did not question events when he was joined by two further superhumans, also air force orphans - Dicky Dauntless would become Young Miracleman and Johnny Bates became Kid Miracleman. The resulting Miracleman Family would also largely fail to perceive the occasional absurdity of their adventures, which included battles against the likes of Young Nastyman, Firebug and a fictional analogue of Gargunza himself, or their suspiciously similar backgrounds. However, by 1961 Miracleman's brain was powerful enough to nearly overload the para-reality; Gargunza was however able to prevent him from fully awakening, and programmed Miracleman with a post-hypnotic fail-safe as a result - though his consciousness was still able to cause his living costume to change. In order to fulfil his desire to have his own consciousness implanted in a new-born superhuman, Gargunza also created Miraclewoman in a secret laboratory as a breeding partner. However in 1963 the scientist's plans unravelled when another of his private projects - Young Nastyman - broke lose. He attempted to use Miraclewoman to recover the escapee and she met the Miracleman Family to enlist their help; however she learnt her true origin and instead faked her death. Close to being discovered, Gargunza fled to Paraguay. Unable to control the Miracleman Family without the scientist, Project Zarathustra controller Sir Dennis Archer put failsafe policy Operation Dragonslayer into action, luring the Miracleman Family to a purported Sky Fortress created by the fictional Gargunza. In reality it was a cloaked nuclear device that seemingly killed the trio, and the project was kept secret and later abandoned. 

However Moran survived the blast, albeit with severe injuries and no memory of his time as Miracleman; found in the Suffolk Marshes with burns and many broken bones, he pieced together his life and undertook a minor career in journalism. He met Elizabeth Sullivan and the pair would marry in 1966. While childless, they enjoyed a happy marriage, though Mike would feel guilt that his freelance writing career brought in less than Liz's more successful illustrating work. He was also plagued by migraines and a recurring dream - unknown to him a recollection of the Miracleman Family's demise. Moran was also troubled by an inability to recall the word he uttered in the dream. On 4th February 1982 he travelled to Larksmere in the Lake District to cover the opening of a new nuclear power plant, which is targeted by a terrorist group. The incident brings on one of Mike's migraines and while being taken to another room he instinctively reads the reversed word "atomic" on the back of a glass door. This caused Miracleman to return after 18 years, and he swiftly disabled the terrorists before flying out of the facility. After a brief visit to the Moon he returned to Liz and told her of his and Moran's history, though at this point he was unaware his time as a superhero was fabricated. She initially treats his story with stunned disbelief before finally accepting the evidence in front of her. They spent the night together before he reverts to Moran and receives a phonecall from Johnny Bates - formerly Kid Miracleman and now CEO of Sunburst Cybernetics. The pair head to London to meet Bates, who tells them he survived the nuclear blast with his memory intact but his powers gone. While Mike is initially overjoyed at his friend's survival he soon realises Bates is lying and is actually still Kid Miracleman, having been corrupted by absolute power. Calling up Miracleman, the pair battle but the intervening 18 years have seen his former protégé grow much more powerful, and Kid Miracleman twice beats him near death in a battle across London. Miracleman is only spared when Kid Miracleman inadvertently speaks his own change-word and reverts to the 11-year old Bates. The shaken Morans leave Bates for the authorities and lay low for two months.

Unaware that Spookshow have hired Evelyn Cream to kill Mike, the pair head to Dartmoor on 1st May 1982 in an attempt to find out more about Miracleman's powers, with Liz also informs Mike she is pregnant by Miracleman. This exacerbates Mike's neuroses and growing inferiority complex regarding Miracleman. Mike is then attacked by Cream in the elevator of the Daily Record newspaper. However the agent merely tranquilises him and proposes an alliance - he will help Miracleman uncover his origins in exchange for the financial and political power their alliance will bring him, feeding Spookshow false information. By 9th July, Cream discovers that the Project Zarathustra bunker is still standing in the Cotswolds and the pair set out to infiltrate the facility. While Archer has arranged special forces and booby traps they do not faze Miracleman, who simply walks through them. Even the insane superhuman Big Ben (an inferior later Zarathustra creation) fails to slow him. After Miracleman enters the bunker with Cream they discover video recordings of the Project that reveal the fabrication of the Miracleman Family's adventures and the role of Gargunza in his creation, sending Miracleman into a fury. Cream is eventually able to calm him and the pair leave.

While Cream warns Spookshow off any further harassment of the Morans, the combined strain of Miracleman's role in their lives and the pregnancy continues to weigh on the couple. However as the birth grows near agents of Gargunza kidnap Liz, with the scientist planning to implant his mind in the baby. With Cream's help Miracleman is able to track Gargunza to his compound in Paraguay. However when the pair attempt to affect a rescue Gargunza uses the overriding change-word Abraxas (installed after the near-awakening in 1961) to revert Miracleman to Mike for an hour. He then sets the augmented Miracledog on the pair; Cream is killed but Mike is able to remember the external change-word used by the creature, reverting it to the dog Pluto. He kills the animal and evades Gargunza's guards until the hour is up. Miracleman then kills the guards and takes Gargunza into orbit, tenderly kissing his creator before hurling him back down to Earth. Liz is in labour, so Miracleman flies her to a more picturesque location before delivering their daughter - who immediately speaks. After they return home Liz asks to have Mike back in the hope of finding normality; he is apologetic about losing two fingers to Miracledog. Mike is initially concerned about his wife's fluctuating mood swings, her sudden declaration that the girl's name Winter popped into her head and the child's rapid development but attempts to be positive. 

Soon after Moran is tracked down and attacked by a pair of Qys agents investigating Earth's use of infra-space. Miracleman is outmatched by the two aliens' ability to change multiple bodies and inadvertently gives away Winter's existence when fighting them. He damages one and attempts to prevent the other from reaching his wife and daughter - only to find Miraclewoman has broken cover to protect them, and tells Miracleman and Liz of her history. A truce is struck with the Qys; as the aliens are sterile that Earth's superhumans can reproduce changes the policy of the Qys and the opposing Warpsmith empire from extermination to alliance. Miracleman and Miraclewoman are transported to Qys, where the pair are assigned to represent the alien world on an observation post behind Earth's moon along with the Warpsmiths Aza Chorn and Phon Mooda. A sweep of the planet also reveals the existence of the Firedrake Huey Moon, who joins their ranks. However the latest developments are finally too much for Liz; while still loving Mike and Miracleman she us growing aware that Winter is controlling her moods and moves to Yarmouth to stay with his sister. Winter for her part reveals just how rapidly she has developed and sets off to explore the universe. Depressed at the loss of his family, Mike hikes up MOUNTAIN, makes a grave and strips naked before changing to Miracleman; the superhuman understands the significance of the gesture and respects the decision, leaving Moran dormant in infra-space. He builds the undersea retreat Silence in order to gather his thoughts.

1985 sees Kid Miracleman finally break free after Bates is finally unable to deal with the torment he faces in St. Crispin's Hospital, and promptly begins destroying London, killing sone forty thousand before Miracleman and his allies realise. The group is warped to London but is unable to contain the savage Kid Miracleman. Aza Chorn arranges to draw additional power for Miracleman from unclear sources and takes them both to Silence in order to keep Kid Miracleman off-balance but even then Miracleman is only barely able to match the unhinged adversary. Kid Miracleman is only finally stopped when Aza Chorn teleports objects inside the enemy's forcefield, putting him in enough pain to force his reversion to Bates at the cost of his own life. The distraught boy pleads with Miracleman to find acway of preventing Kid Miracleman from returning; tearfully Miracleman says he has and pulverises Bates' head. With their presence now public knowledge, Miracleman and his friends take control of Earth and begin shaping it into utopia. They remove nuclear weaponry, restructure the economy, abolish money, promise superhuman abilities and offspring to anyone who wants them, end crime and prisons and create the huge palace Olympus on the remains of London. Miracleman meanwhile finally enters a physical relationship with Miraclewoman. He is however perplexed when he meets with Liz and offers to move her to the top of the waiting list for enhancement. She refuses and accuses him of losing his humanity, an accusation that bothers him.

As literal gods on Earth, Miracleman and his cohorts dwell at Olympus thereafter, choosing to help the world and its people as they see fit. Miracleman for his part largely stays at Olympus as a figurehead, meeting pilgrims who undertake the arduous climb to have an audience with him. He keeps in regular contact with the others and largely has ultimate authority where he chooses to do so. However he is still quietly unsure of whether he has done the right thing, and attends the 1993 London carnival incognito, consulting a spaceman (a drug addict treated as an oracle) in an attempt to find validation. 

Miracleman works with Mors to create a new body for Young Miracleman, who is resurrected in 2001. He attempts to gently bring his old friend up to speed but after Young Miracleman baulks at Olympus is forced to tell him the truth. Miracleman worries about Young Miracleman's unhappiness but is eventually convinced by Miraclewoman that the disaffection is due to an unrequited homosexual crush. Miracleman thus attempts to kiss his comrade, who reacts with fury and flees Olympus. Miracleman is subsequently bothered by his mishandling of the situation and resorts to viewing recordings of his ally's dream adventures to try and find some insight.

Powers and abilities
Miracleman can fly, has super-strength and is invulnerable. The source of his strength and durability is a forcefield, derived from Qys technology. He is able to tear open a bunker door without apparent effort, push his finger through a human chest without any sort of run-up, and clapping his hands together causes a concussive blast that deafens those within range. Miracleman survives being in the range of the Operation Dragonslayer nuclear bomb unscathed, only being forced into dormancy by the physical and mental damage done to Mike Moran, and is impervious to bullets, blades, rocket launchers and conventional explosives. He can survive without oxygen, and is able to singlehandedly carve Silence from subsea rock. Liz finds his speed cannot be measured by a stopwatch, estimating it as well over Mach 2. In the original, the character could fly around Earth fast enough to move backwards or forwards in time, an ability that has yet to be featured in the revival.

Reception 
In 2022, Newsarama included Miracleman in their "Best Marvel characters left to adapt to the MCU" list.

Other versions
An alternate version of Miracleman is one of the heroes of Earth-238 that appears in the Captain Britain stories written by Moore and Alan Davis around the time of their work together on Marvelman for Warrior. A grave bearing the name is seen by Captain Britain shortly before he is killed by the Fury on the alternate world; the character's death at the hands of the symbiote was then shown in flashback during a nightmare experienced by
Linda McQuillan (the superhero Captain UK). Moore would later recall that they came up for the name for the Marvel appearances but it features in his original proposal for the Warrior strip as an alternate title, but it was the first use of the name in print. When asked, Moore could not recall if he remembered using it when settling on renaming Marvelman for Eclipse Comics.

Notes

References

Eclipse Comics superheroes
Fictional characters with superhuman senses
Marvel Comics characters who can move at superhuman speeds
Marvel Comics characters with superhuman strength
Marvel Comics superheroes
Miracleman